Hexabothriidae is a family of monogenean parasites. The family name was proposed by Emmett W. Price in 1942. The family includes 14-16 genera according to authors  and about 60 species; all are parasitic on the gills of chondrichthyan fishes (rays, sharks and chimaeras).

Studies on phylogeny of monogeneans based on morphology, molecules  or spermatozoa  suggest that the Hexabothriidae are a basal group within the Polyopisthocotylea.

Genera

According to the World Register of Marine Species 
Branchotenthes Bullard & Dippenaar, 2003  

Callorhynchocotyle Suriano & Incorvaia, 1982 
Dasyoncocotyle Hargis, 1955 
Epicotyle Euzet & Maillard, 1974 
Erpocotyle Van Beneden & Hesse, 1863 
Heteronchocotyle Brooks, 1934 
Hexabothrium von Nordmann, 1840 
Mobulicola Patella & Bullard, 2013 
Neonchocotyle Ktari & Maillard, 1972 <ref>{{cite journal | last1 = Ktari | first1 = Mohammed Hedi | last2 = Maillard | first2 = Claude | year = 1972 | title = Neonchocotyle pastinacae n. g. n. sp. (Monogenea Hexabothriidae) parasite de Dasyatis pastinaca dans le Golfe de Tunis : description de l'adulte et de la larve | journal = Annales de Parasitologie Humaine et Comparée | volume = 47 | issue = 2| pages = 181–191 | doi = 10.1051/parasite/1972472181 }}</ref>Paraheteronchocotyle Mayes, Brooks & Thorson, 1981  (omitted in WoRMS  but considered valid )Pristonchocotyle Watson & Thorsen, 1976 Protocotyle Euzet & Maillard, 1974  (example: Protocotyle euzetmaillardi)Pseudohexabothrium Brinkmann, 1952 Rajonchocotyle Cerfontaine, 1899 Rhinobatonchocotyle Doran, 1953 Squalonchocotyle'' Cerfontaine, 1899

References

Polyopisthocotylea
Platyhelminthes families